was a Japanese noble and statesman of the late Heian period and early Kamakura period. Serving in the courts of seven different emperors, he brought the Murakami Genji to the peak of their success.

Life

Aide to Emperor Takakura 
Michichika's father Masamichi served Bitokumon-in during Emperor Toba's cloistered rule, but changed his role under the cloistered rule of Emperor Go-Shirakawa. In 1168, when Go-Shirakawa's wife  became kōtaigō, Masamichi became . Michichika was permitted entry into the court along with Emperor Takakura's ascension in the same year, serving as a close aid to the young emperor. Michichika's first wife was a daughter of the daijō-daijin , but he soon took a daughter of Taira no Norimori or Michimori as his second wife, strengthening his ties with that powerful clan.

After Taira no Kiyomori's coup d'etat in late 1179, Emperor Takakura reluctantly abdicated the throne to begin his own cloistered rule, and Michichika supported his inexperienced efforts as head of his cloistered government. Michichika joined the imperial outing to Itsukushima and relocation of the capital to Fukuhara-kyō in the first half of the year, but as the country fell into upheaval after the first battle of Uji, he returned to Heian-kyō in the autumn. The retired emperor Takakura's physical condition worsened and he fell ill. Michichika composed a poem praying for his recovery, but in 1181, Takakura died at 21 years old. As a close attendant of the dead sovereign, Michichika was bestowed an undyed white mourning dress.

Genpei War 
Shortly thereafter Taira no Kiyomori died and Go-Shirakawa reopened his cloistered rule, and the center of power continued to change at a dizzying pace. Meanwhile, Michichika avoided relying on the patronage of any particular power, but participated passionately in debates at Go-Shirakawa's palace and worked diligently at the business of government, increasing his presence in the court. When the Taira clan fled the capital in 1183, he went visited Go-Shirakawa in order to bid them farewell. When Emperor Go-Toba took the throne in the next month, the Imperial Regalia were in the possession of the Taira. Michichika raised the examples of Emperor Guangwu of Han and Emperor Yuan of Jin, who obtained their imperial seals only after assuming the throne, in order to help Go-Toba ascend smoothly. He was present at Hōjūjidono during the Siege of Hōjūjidono that autumn.

Michichika's loyalty was recognized, and in spring of 1185 he was promoted to provisional chūnagon, and that winter was appointed as one of ten ministers appointed to oversee the court, called . He was granted Inaba Province as a fief and recommended his second son  as its governor. He married Emperor Go-Toba's wetnurse, and adopted her daughter . As Michichika headed the event teams for Kujō Kanezane's proclamations as nairan and head of the sekkan Fujiwara clan, and Kanezane praised Michichika's hard work in turn, the relationship between the two appears to have been healthy at the time. Under Kanezane's conservative administration, though, Michichika's promotion stalled. Kanezane criticized Michichika harshly, calling him ungrateful for his promotion to  the previous year, and in this no different from a bird or animal. After this, their relationship soured, and Michichika began to look for an opportunity to take Kanezane down.

Guardian to Senyōmon-in 
In late 1189, Michichika invited Go-Shirakawa to the Koga estate and presented him with various gifts. A month and a half later, Go-Shirakawa's youngest daughter  was proclaimed an imperial princess, and Michichika was appointed as her guardian, strengthening his relationship with her birth mother . When Go-Shirakawa died in 1192, it was Senyōmon-in who inherited his largest territory , and as Michichika was its effective manager, he brought the courtiers in control of it into his jurisdiction, forming a strong political foothold for himself.

After Go-Shirakawa's death, Kujō Kanezane controlled the court through the young Emperor Go-Toba, but his strict adherence to tradition and stress on lineage in personnel affairs fostered opposition amongst the middle and lower ranking nobles, and he gradually lost popularity in the court. Michichika won over the noble families of Fujiwara no Akisue and the  branch of the Fujiwara, who Kanezane had treated coldly, as allies. Meanwhile, he used Takashina no Eishi as an intermediary to alienate Yoritomo, who wanted to marry his daughter Ō-hime to the Emperor, from Kanezane, who had already married his own daughter Kujō Ninshi to said emperor. In 1195, Michichika was promoted to dainagon, and when his adopted daughter Zaishi bore the Emperor a prince, the future Emperor Tsuchimikado, his position in the court suddenly solidified. In 1196, he made Kujō Ninshi leave the palace and overthrew Kanezane, replacing him with Konoe Motomichi in a coup d'etat.

Minamoto Hakuriku 
In 1198, Michichika forced the enthronement of Emperor Tsuchimikado against both precedent and the opposition of the shogunate. Though Michichika tried to use the case of Emperor Kōnin as a precedent for the sudden enthronement, Fujiwara no Teika scathingly commented "If Tsuchimikado is Kōnin, then who is Dōkyō?" After this, Michichika reached the height of his power as the Emperor's maternal grandfather, and was called . The term "Hakuriku" here refers to the position of kampaku, although Michichika himself never officially held the title.

Once Yoritomo's death was publicly announced, it would become necessary to delay Yoriie's promotion, and so Michichika hurriedly conducted both appointments in a simplified fashion. Teika once again criticized Michichika for enforcing the appointment while knowing of Yoritomo's demise and then expressing his condolences and making a show of mourning the next day, calling this an "egregious plot". Yoritomo's death upset the political situation, and in the capital  plotted an attack on Michichika, forcing him to hide in the retired emperor's palace. Executives of the shogunate, with Ōe no Hiromoto at the center, supported Michichika, suppressing the movement to remove him and restoring peace to the capital.

Michichika made various preparations, rebuilding Tsuchimikado's palace and adding a gate, and that summer was promoted to naidaijin. While respecting the viewpoint of the now-mature retired emperor Go-Toba, Michichika placed Kujō Yoshitsune as sadaijin and Konoe Iezane as udaijin to preserve peace between and with both families. Since both were still young, Michichika was effectively in control of the Daijō-kan. Around this time, he also married Fujiwara no Motofusa's daughter Ishi.

In 1200 Go-Toba's third son Prince Morinari, the future Emperor Juntoku, became crown prince. Michichika became his , while his brother-in-law  became , and his heir  provisionally assumed the same title, filling the Crown Prince's Quarters with the Murakami Genji and his Fujiwara relatives. Even 1202 he appeared vigorous, acting as event manager when his adopted daughter Zaishi received the Buddhist name , and welcoming Go-Toba to a palace built by his sworn friend , but he suddenly died that autumn at age 54. When Konoe Iezane heard of his death, he recorded in his diary that Michichika had handled all the business of government, and the court granted him the posthumous . Go-Toba was also said to have expressed his sorrow by stopping holding poetry contests. After Michichika's death, there was nobody left who could dissuade Go-Toba, and he began his cloistered rule in earnest.

However, he died without seeing its completion. That collection, along with many others, includes some of Michichika's waka.

Famous works 
, written in 1180, is Michichika's travel diary from retired Emperor Takakura's Imperial visit to Itsukushima in Aki Province. , written in 1181, records the state of affairs at the time of Emperor Takakura's death and mourns him. Both are written in a mix of kana and kanji, as is modern Japanese.

Genealogy 
Father: 
Wife: daughter of 
Eldest son: 
Second son: , descendants became Horikawa clan (died out in Muromachi period)
Third son: , descendants carried on Koga clan
Fourth son: , descendants became Tsuchimikado clan (died out in Muromachi period)
Fifth son: , descendants became Nakanoin clan
Wife: , daughter of Fujiwara no Motofusa
Son?: , possibly instead a grandchild via Michitomo
Wife: , lady-in-waiting of Shōmeimon-in
Sixth son: 
Other children:
Son: 
Son: 
Son: 
Daughter: , wetnurse of Emperor Go-Saga
Adopted son: 
Adopted son: , heir of Ōe no Hiromoto

However, Michimune's daughter  and Emperor Tsuchimikado's son became Emperor Go-Saga, and so Michichika's family gained the position of maternal relatives to both Tsuchimikado and Go-Saga.

Later, the Saionji family rose to power, and Michichika's clan never regained the stature it had during his life. Even so, his children Michitomo, Michiteru, Sadamichi, and Michikata split the family into the Horikawa clan, Koga clan, Tsuchimikado clan, and Nakanoin clan. The Horikawa and Tsuchimikado clans died out in the Muromachi period, but the Koga and Nakanoin families persisted until the Meiji restoration, joining the Kazoku peerage upon its creation.

Michichika's most famous descendant was the Zen monk Dōgen, who returned from Song dynasty and created the Sōtō school 24 years after Michichika's death.

Michichika's adopted son Shōkū became a disciple of Hōnen, and became the founder of the Seizan sub-sect of Jōdo-shū buddhism.

Notes

References 

Fujiwara clan
1149 births
1202 deaths
People of Heian-period Japan
People of Kamakura-period Japan
Japanese diarists
Heian period Buddhists
Kamakura period Buddhists